James M. Barnes may refer to:
 Jim Barnes  (James Martin Barnes, 1886–1966), English golfer
 James M. Barnes (politician) (1899–1958), U.S. Representative from Illinois

See also
 James Barnes (disambiguation)